Peter Kobel (born 25 April 1969) is a retired Swiss football goalkeeper.

References

1969 births
Living people
Swiss men's footballers
BSC Young Boys players
Servette FC players
FC Solothurn players
Grasshopper Club Zürich players
SC Bümpliz 78 players
FC Thun players
Association football goalkeepers
Switzerland under-21 international footballers